Pteroidichthys noronhai, Noronha’s scorpionfish, is a species of marine ray-finned fish belonging to the family Scorpaenidae, the scorpionfishes. It is found in the  central western Pacific Ocean.

Taxonomy
Pteroidichthys noronhai was first formally described as Pteropelor noronhai in 1938 by the American ichthyologist Henry Weed Fowler with the type locality given as near Hong Kong. The genus Pteroelor was subsequently recognised as a synonym of Pteroidichthys.

Description
Pteroidichthys noronhai  has 12 rigid spines and 8-9soft rays in its dorsal fin with 3 spines and 5 soft rays in its anal fin. It has a relatively short snout, which avareages 15.3% of its standard length and is shorter than the distance between the rearmost part of the orbit and the rear edge of the operculum. The rearmost part of the maxilla reached beyond a vertical line through the centre of the pupil. It has poorly developed tentacles above the eyes and just a small number of tantacles on the body and fins. There are well developed spinjes with pointed tips on the lacrimal and suborbital bones. This is a brown fish with indistinct darker markings on the head and on the back at the base of each part of the dorsal fin. The fin membrane of the spiny part of the dorsal fin is black at its base and grey distally, the membrane of the soft rayed part is blotched with grey and is darker grey terminally, The other fins are greyish with black margins.

Distribution and habitat
Pteroidichthys noronhai is found in the Indo-West Pacific and has been recorded from widely separated localities. It has been found in southern Japan, southern China, Saya de Malha Bank, Taiwan, .the Philippines, northwestern Australia, the Chesterfield Islands and Vanuatu.

References

noronhai
Fish described in 1938
Taxa named by Henry Weed Fowler